An outdoor bronze sculpture of Daniel Webster by Thomas Ball is installed in Central Park, Manhattan, New York. The "larger-than-life-size" statue was commissioned in the 1870s, to be installed along Central Park's Mall. It was instead installed along the West Drive at 72nd Street due to size restrictions. Daniel Webster was presented by Gordon W. Burnham in 1876.

See also
 1876 in art
 Daniel Webster Memorial
 Statue of Daniel Webster (Boston)
 Statue of Daniel Webster (U.S. Capitol)

References

External links

 
 Central Park: Daniel Webster, New York City Department of Parks and Recreation

1876 establishments in New York (state)
1876 sculptures
Bronze sculptures in Central Park
Daniel Webster
Monuments and memorials in Manhattan
Outdoor sculptures in Manhattan
Sculptures in Central Park
Sculptures of men in New York City
Statues in New York City